Georgios "George" Higoumenakis (1895–27 December 1983) was a Greek dermatologist born in Kastelli, Iraklion, Crete, Ottoman Empire. He was the first to describe Higoumenakis' sign.

Career
Higoumenakis studied medicine at the Medical School of the National University of Athens. He then chose to become a dermatologist and went to France to study under Gaston Milian, a famous syphilologist, at the Hospital St. Louis.

He returned to Greece in 1924, became a member of the Medical Society of Athens and began practicing medicine privately. He aspired to pursue an academic career as well in the National University of Athens, but this never occurred, possibly due to conflicts with professors at the Medical School of Athens.

In 1927, he first described the unilateral enlargement of the sternoclavicular portion of the clavicle, seen in congenital syphilis. This became known as Higoumenakis' sign.

He became a director of the Department of Dermatology at the Evangelismos Hospital (the country's largest) and practised medicine until the 1940s.

Although he continued practising medicine, he also became involved with politics. From 1964 to 1967, he was a Member of the Greek Parliament and eventually became Minister of Health.

Family
Konstanin G. Higoumenakis is his son. He is a dermatologist and a retired assistant professor of Dermatology from the National and Kapodistrian University of Athens.

References

20th-century Greek physicians
Greek dermatologists
Health ministers of Greece
Greek MPs 1964–1967
1895 births
1983 deaths
National and Kapodistrian University of Athens alumni
People from Heraklion (regional unit)